Peltuinum was a Roman town of the Vestini, on the ancient Via Claudia Nova, 20 km east of L'Aquila, Italy, between the modern-day settlements of Prata d'Ansidonia and Castelnuovo.  It was apparently the chief town of that portion of the Vestini who dwelt west of the main Apennine chain. Remains of the town walls, of an amphitheatre, of a temple and of other buildings still exist. The city was the birthplace of Gnaeus Domitius Corbulo, a Roman general from the age of Nero.

References

Populated places established in the 1st century BC
Roman sites of Abruzzo
Former populated places in Italy
Roman towns and cities in Abruzzo
Prata d'Ansidonia
San Pio delle Camere